Wittliff is a surname. Notable people with the surname include:

 Phil Wittliff (born 1948), American ice hockey player, coach, and executive
 William D. Wittliff (1940–2019), American screenwriter, author, and photographer